Major-General Merton Beckwith-Smith,  (11 July 1890 – 11 November 1942) was a senior British Army officer during both the First and Second World Wars.

Early life and military career
Beckwith-Smith was born on 11 July 1890 at 24 Walton Street, Chelsea to stockbroker Beckwith Smith and Georgina Butler Moore.

His education took in Warren Hill School at Eastbourne, Eton and Christ Church, Oxford.

In 1910 he was commissioned into the Coldstream Guards. He served with the Guards throughout the First World War, eventually becoming a staff officer in the Guards Division. On 4 October 1914, while the 1st Guards Brigade was holding trenches opposite the German line at the River Aisne, Beckwith-Smith was ordered by Brigadier-General Charles FitzClarence to carry out a nighttime raid against a German position known as 'Fish Hook Trench'. This was the first British trench raid of the First World War. Beckwith-Smith was still just a lieutenant at the time and the raid was considered to be a striking success. On the front of the 1/Coldstream, just east of the Troyon factory road, the Germans had run out a sap, and it was decided to fill it in. At 8 P.M. a platoon of the battalion, led by Beckwith-Smith (who was wounded and subsequently received the Distinguished Service Order), crossing the hundred yards of No Man's Land, rushed the trench with the bayonet. The award of the DSO was reported in the Edinburgh Gazette on 13 November 1914,

Now a captain, Beckwith-Smith was awarded the French Croix de Guerre in 1917. In the same year Captain Beckwith-Smith was awarded the Military Cross.

Between the wars
After the war Beckwith-Smith commanded the Officers' Training Corps at the University of Oxford. While he was commanding the Officers' Training Corps, the university conferred on him an honorary degree of MA. He then attended the Staff College, Camberley from 1921 to 1922.

The Times recorded Beckwith-Smith's appointment as Officer Commanding the Welsh Guards Regiment and Regimental District from 1 October 1934. In his capacity as Lieutenant-Colonel commanding the Welsh Guards, Beckwith-Smith participated in the Royal Procession at the Trooping the Colour of 1936, and again the following year.

Beckwith-Smith spent fourteen months serving in India in command of the Lahore Brigade.

Second World War

France 

In 1940, during the Second World War, he was given command of the 1st Guards Brigade, part of the British Expeditionary Force (BEF) sent to France in 1939/1940.

When Lord Gort was ordered home and was replaced by Harold Alexander, Beckwith-Smith succeeded him in command of the 1st Division.

He took part in the defence of the Dunkirk Perimeter, telling his officers,

During the battle he also spoke to his men about how to deal with the Luftwaffe Stuka dive bombers, 'Stand up to them. Shoot at them with a Bren gun from the shoulder. Take them like a high pheasant. Give them plenty of lead. £5 to any man who brings one down.'

For his service in the Battle of France he was mentioned in dispatches.

After he was evacuated to England, Beckwith-Smith was given command of the Territorial 18th Infantry Division, which he trained in preparation for duty overseas.

Singapore 

In early 1942, after many weeks at sea, Beckwith-Smith's division was landed at Singapore. Japanese forces invaded Singapore Island on 8 February. Because of the defensive strategy implemented by the Allied commander, Lieutenant-General Arthur Percival, most of the British 18th Division saw little or no action. Percival surrendered all British and Commonwealth troops at Singapore on 15 February, including Beckwith-Smith and his division.

He was reported just prior to capture as being 'quite undisturbed by the calamity, continuing his duties even when the roof of his headquarters was burning over his head.

Prior to his being sent to Formosa in August 1942, Beckwith-Smith sent a message to his men:

On 11 November 1942 Merton Beckwith-Smith died at Karenko Camp of diphtheria as a prisoner of war. A report in The Times reported that the official Japanese news agency said Colonel Robert Hoffman of the US Army was with him, along with other British generals, when he died. In 1946, the Imperial War Graves Commission (now the Commonwealth War Graves Commission) exhumed all the Taiwan prisoner of war remains and reburied them in the Sai Wan War Cemetery in Hong Kong. Many years later his grave was identified by Jack Edwards on the request of Diana, Princess of Wales.

Personal life
Beckwith-Smith married Honor Dorothy Leigh on 14 March 1918 at St George's Church, Hanover Square in Westminster. He lived at the Manor House, Stratton Audley, which his wife had inherited from her father in 1931, and Aberarder, Inverness. He had four children: Peter, Rosemary, Sarah and John. His daughter Katherine Sarah married Johnny Henderson, and her children include the British racehorse trainer Nicky Henderson. Another grandchild is Anne Beckwith-Smith, Princess Diana's Lady-in-Waiting.

References

Bibliography

External links
Generals of World War II

1890 births
1942 deaths
People educated at Eton College
Coldstream Guards officers
Welsh Guards officers
British Army personnel of World War I
British Army generals of World War II
Companions of the Distinguished Service Order
Recipients of the Military Cross
Military of Singapore under British rule
World War II prisoners of war held by Japan
Recipients of the Croix de Guerre (France)
Deaths from diphtheria
Infectious disease deaths in Taiwan
Respiratory disease deaths in Taiwan
British Army major generals
Military personnel from London
People from Chelsea, London
Graduates of the Staff College, Camberley
Graduates of the Royal Military College, Sandhurst
British Army personnel killed in World War II
Burials at Sai Wan War Cemetery